Mărășești is a town in Vrancea County, Romania.

Mărăşeşti can also refer to:

 , a World War II Romanian destroyer
 Mărășești (frigate), a Romanian Navy frigate
 Mărăşeşti, a village administered by Baia de Aramă town, Mehedinţi County, Romania
 Mărăşeşti, a village in Band Commune, Mureș County, Romania
 Mărăşeşti, a village in Voineşti Commune, Vaslui County, Romania
 Mărăşeşti, a village in Cubolta Commune, Sîngerei district, Moldova

See also 
 Mărăști (disambiguation)